Kenneth Humphrey Lewis (born 10 November 1928) is a former Welsh cricketer who played first-class cricket for Glamorgan from 1950 to 1956.

Ken Lewis was a fast bowler from Montgomeryshire whose career was hampered by injury. While serving in the Royal Artillery during his national service in the late 1940s he took wickets regularly for services teams, and was signed by Glamorgan in 1950. He appeared in 36 first-class matches over seven seasons before a serious leg injury ended his career in 1956. He scored 312 runs with a highest score of 34 and took 55 wickets with a best performance of 4 for 25 in Glamorgan's innings victory over Kent in 1953.

After his playing career ended, Lewis returned to Montgomeryshire.

References

External links
 

1928 births
Welsh cricketers
People from Newtown, Powys
Sportspeople from Powys
Glamorgan cricketers
Living people
20th-century British Army personnel
Royal Artillery personnel
Military personnel from Montgomeryshire